Sally, Irene, and Mary is a 1925 American silent comedy drama film starring Constance Bennett, Sally O'Neil, and Joan Crawford. It is based on the 1922 play of the same name by Eddie Dowling and Cyrus Woods and takes a behind-the-scenes look at the romantic lives of three chorus girls and the way their preferences in men affect their lives. The play was adapted again in 1938, again titled Sally, Irene, and Mary and directed by William A. Seiter. That version stars Alice Faye, Joan Davis, and Marjorie Weaver in the title roles, and co-starred Tony Martin, Fred Allen, and Jimmy Durante. 

Erté designed the stage show costumes and sets.

Plot
As described in a review in a film magazine, three members of the chorus of a Broadway show, Sally, the worldly-wise chorine in search of a sugar daddy, Irene, the dreamer, sought after by one of the Broadway wolves and also by a fine young chap, and Mary, an innocent little Irish girl who almost gets singed by the Bright Lights. Sally's wealthy protector sees in Mary a new beauty and falls for her. Sally is dazzled and resents the attitude of her sweetheart who is a plumber. Irene succumbs to the lure of the Broadway wolf but, in a moment of goodness, he sends her home before it is too late. She marries the other fellow but they are killed when a train hits their honeymoon automobile. Sally's genuine grief and real love for her moneyed friend coupled with her unmasking of his real character, together with Irene's sudden death, so impress Mary that she says Broadway will never get her. Leaving the sordidness behind, she returns to her plumber sweetheart and settles down.

Cast

Preservation
A print of Sally, Irene and Mary was preserved by MGM and transferred to the George Eastman Museum Motion Picture Collection. A restoration funded under a grant from the Louis B. Mayer Foundation was completed in 2019.

References

External links

Posters and lobby cards at joancrawfordbest.com

1925 films
Metro-Goldwyn-Mayer films
American black-and-white films
American films based on plays
Films directed by Edmund Goulding
American silent feature films
1925 comedy-drama films
1920s American films
1920s English-language films
Silent American comedy-drama films